David Woodward (born 1959, West Molesey, Surrey) is a British economist and economic advisor. He graduated from Keble College, Oxford in philosophy, politics and economics in 1982. After graduating, he joined the Foreign and Commonwealth Office in London, where he worked as an economic advisor working on debt, structural adjustment and other development issues, with emphasis on Latin America and South East Asia.

He later spent two years in Washington, D.C., working in the office of the UK's executive director to the International Monetary Fund and the World Bank. After returning to Britain, he worked as a research coordinator on debt for Save the Children and (after several years as an independent consultant) as a policy officer for Asia for The Catholic Institute for International Relations (now Progressio). He then spent two and a half years as a development economist with the World Health Organization, and several years as an independent consultant, before joining the New Economics Foundation, where he was head of the New Global Economy Programme for three years.

He is again an independent writer and researcher, focusing primarily on global economic governance, the interface between development, the environment and health, and alternatives to the neoliberal model of development.

Written works

Books
Woodward, D. (1992) Debt, Adjustment and Poverty in Developing Countries. London: Pinter Publishers/Save the Children (UK):
Volume I:	National and International Dimensions of Debt and Adjustment in Developing Countries.
Volume II:	The Impact of Debt and Adjustment at the Household Level in Developing Countries.
Woodward, D. (2001) The Next Crisis? Direct and Equity Investment in Developing Countries. London: [Zed Books].Smith, R., Beaglehole, R., Woodward, D. and Drager, N. (eds.) (2003) Global Public Goods for Health: Health Economic and Public Health Perspectives. Oxford: Oxford University Press.

Articles in Academic Journals
Drager, N., Woodward, D., Beaglehole, R. and Lipson, D. (2001) "Globalization and the Health of the Poor". Development, 44(1): pp. 73–76
Woodward, D., Drager, N., Beaglehole, R. and Lipson, D.  (2001) "Globalization and Health: a Framework for Analysis and Action" Bulletin of the World Health Organization 79(9): pp. 875–881
Smith, R., Woodward, D., Acharya, A., Beaglehole, R. and Drager, N. (2004) "Communicable Disease Control: A ‘Global Public Good’ Perspective". Health Policy and Planning 19(5): pp. 271–278
Woodward. D. (2005) "The GATS and Trade in Health Services: Implications for HealthCare in Developing Countries". Review of International Political Economy 12(3): pp. 511–534
McCoy, D. Narayan, R. Baum, F., Sanders, D., Serag, H., Salvage, J., Rowson, M., Schrecker, T., Woodward, D., Labonte, R., Sengupta, A., Qizphe, A. and Schuftan, C. (2006) "A new Director General for WHO—an opportunity for bold and inspirational leadership". The Lancet 368(9553): pp. 2179–2183, 16 December 2006
Woodward, D. (2007) "Vote buying in the UN Security Council". The Lancet 369 (9555): 12–13, 6 January 2007
Woodward, D. and Labonte, R. (2008) "Reducing Poverty Sustainably, in a Carbon-Constrained Future". The Lancet 372(9634): 186–188, 19 July 2008
Woodward, D. (forthcoming) "Of 'Misguided Notions' and Misguiding Nations: the Growth Report, Poverty and Climate Change". Political QuarterlyChapters and papers in edited volumes
Woodward, D. (1993) "The Costs to the North of the Current Approach to Adjustment". One World Action: The British Economy and Third World Debt. London: One World Action
Woodward, D. (1995) Direct and Portfolio Investment: Advantages and Disadvantages. EURODAD: World Credit Tables, 1994–95. European Network on Debt and Development, Brussels
Woodward, D. (1996) "IMF Gold Sales as a Source of Funds for Multilateral Debt Reduction". EURODAD: World Credit Tables, 1996. European Network on Debt and Development, Brussels
Woodward, D. (1996) "Debt Sustainability and the Debt Overhang in Highly-Indebted Poor Countries: some Comments on the IMF's Views". EURODAD: World Credit Tables, 1996. European Network on Debt and Development, Brussels
Woodward, D. (1996) "Effects of Globalization and Liberalization on Poverty: Concepts and Issues". UNCTAD: Globalisation and Liberalisation: Effects of International Economic Relations on Poverty. Geneva: UNCTAD. Inter-Agency Thematic Contribution to the International Year for the Eradication of PovertyWoodward, D. (1998) "The HIPC Initiative: Beyond the Basics". EURODAD: Taking Stock of Debt: Creditor Policy in the Face of Debtor Poverty. Brussels: European Network on Debt and DevelopmentWoodward, D., Drager, N., Beaglehole, R. and Lipson, D.  (2002) "Globalization, Global Public Goods and Health". Vieira, C. and Drager, N. (Eds.) Trade in Health Services: Global, Regional and Country Perspectives. Washington D.C. Pan-American Health Organization
Woodward, D. and Smith, R.  (2003) "Global Public Goods for Health: Concepts and Issues". Smith, R., Beaglehole, R., Woodward, D. and Drager, N. (eds.) (2003) Global Public Goods for Health: Health Economic and Public Health Perspectives. Oxford: Oxford University Press
Smith, R. and Woodward, D. (2003) "Global Public Goods for Health: Use and Limitations". Smith, R., Beaglehole, R., Woodward, D. and Drager, N. (eds.) (2003) "Global Public Goods for Health: Health Economic and Public Health Perspectives". Oxford: Oxford University Press
 Smith, R., Beaglehole, R., Woodward, D. and Drager, N. (2003) "Global Public Goods for Health: from Theory to Policy". Smith et al. (2003), as above
Woodward, D. and Simms, A. (2007) "Growth Is Failing the Poor: the Unbalanced Distribution of the Benefits and Costs of Global Economic Growth". Jomo, K.S. and Baudot, J. (eds.) Flat World, Big Gaps: Economic Liberalization, Globalization, Poverty and Inequality. London: Zed Books/UN Department of Economic and Social Affairs
Lee, K., Koivusalo, M., Ollila, E., Labonté, R., Schuftan, C. and Woodward, D. (2009) "Global Governance for Health". Labonte, R., Schrecker, T., Packer, C. and Runnels, V. (eds.) Globalisation and Health: Pathways, Evidence and Policy. London: Routledge
Smith, R., Woodward, D., Acharya, A., Beaglehole, R. and Drager, N. (2009) "Communicable Disease Control: a ‘Global Public Good’". J. Kirton (ed.) Global Health. The Library of Essays on Global Governance. Ashgate

Working and discussion papers
Woodward, D. (1992) "Present Pain, Future Hope”?: Debt, Adjustment and Poverty in Developing Countries". Overseas Department Working Paper No. 1, Save the Children (UK), London
Woodward, D. (1992) Debt, Adjustment and Food Security. Overseas Department Working Paper No. 3, Save the Children (UK), London
Woodward, D. (1993) Structural Adjustment Policies: What Are They? Are They Working? Briefing Paper, Catholic Institute for International Relations, London
Costello, A., Watson, F. and Woodward, D. (1994) Human Face or Human Façade? Adjustment and the Health of Mothers and Children. Occasional Paper, Institute of Child Health, London
Woodward, D. and Pryke, J. (1994) The GATT Agreement on Agriculture: will it Help Developing Countries? Seminar Background Paper, Catholic Institute for International Relations, London
Woodward, D., Eduardo, T. and Berlin, G. (1994) Refugees, Rehabilitation, Resources: Issues in Basic Education Planning in Mozambique, World University Service (UK), London and Instituto Nacional do Desenvolvimento da Educação, Maputo
Woodward, D. (1994) Reform of the EU Sugar Régime: Implications for Developing Country Sugar Exporters. Occasional Paper, Catholic Institute for International Relations, London
Pryke, J. and Woodward, D. (1995) The Common Agricultural Policy: Sustainable or Bankrupt? Conference Background Paper, Catholic Institute for International Relations, London
Woodward, D. (1997) User Charges for Health Service in Developing Countries: an Approach to Analysing the Effects on Utilisation and Health Outcomes. Occasional Paper, Institute of Child Health, London
Woodward, D. (1998) The IMF, the World Bank and Economic Policy in Bosnia. Working Paper, Oxfam (UK/I), Oxford
Woodward, D. (1998) "Globalisation, Uneven Development and Poverty: Recent Trends and Policy Implications" Poverty Working Paper No. 4, United Nations Development Programme]
Woodward, D. (1998) Drowning by Numbers: the IMF, the World Bank and North-South Financial Flows. Bretton Woods Project
Northover, H., Woodward, D. and Joyner, K. (1998) A Human Development Approach to Debt Relief for the World's Poor. North-South Issues, No. 21, Trocaire, Dublin CAFOD website
Woodward, D. (1999) Time to Change the Prescription: a Policy Response to the Asian Financial Crisis. Special Briefing, Catholic Institute for International Relations, London
Woodward, D. (1999) Contagion and Cure: Tackling the Crisis in Global Finance. Comment, Catholic Institute for International Relations, London
Woodward, D. (2000) Health, Global Public Goods and Externalities: some General Issues. Discussion Paper, Department of Health and Development, World Health Organization
Woodward, D. (2001) Globalization and Health: an Analytical Framework. Discussion Paper, Department of Health and Development, World Health Organization, Geneva
Woodward, D. (2001) Food Security, Nutrition and Health: Implications of Trade Liberalisation and the WTO Agreements. Discussion Paper, Department of Health and Development, World Health Organization, Geneva
Woodward, D. (2001) Trade Barriers and Prices of Essential Health Sector Inputs Background Paper WG4:9, Commission on Macroeconomics and Health
Woodward, D. (2003) Financial Effects of Foreign Direct Investment in the Context of a Possible WTO Agreement on Investment. Trade and Development Working Paper No. 21, Third World Network, Penang.
Woodward, D. and Simms, A. (2006) "Growth Isn't Working: the Uneven Distribution of Costs and Benefits from Economic Growth" nef (new economics foundation), January 2006
Woodward, D. and Simms, A. (2006) "Growth Is Failing the Poor: the Unbalanced Distribution of the Benefits and Costs of Global Economic Growth" UN Department of Social and Economic Affairs, March 2006
Woodward, D. (2007) IMF Voting Reform: Need, Opportunity and Options Paper for the G24 Technical Meeting, 12 March 2007
Woodward, D. (undated) Democratizing the IMF Policy Briefing No. 2, G24 (based on IMF Voting Reform, as above)
Woodward, D. (forthcoming) "How Poor is "Poor?" – Towards a Rights-Based Poverty Line" @ nef (new economics foundation)

Electronically published papers
Woodward, D. (2003) Trading Health for Profit: the Implications of the GATS and Trade in Health Services for Health in Developing Countries   UK Partnership for Global Health
Woodward, D. (2007) "Economic models: is there an alternative to neoliberalism?" nef (new economics foundation), Development and Environment Group; BOND, March 2007
Woodward, D. (2009) "The IMF: Governance". Backgrounder, #2, EG4 Health, March 2009

Evidence to parliamentary committees
Woodward, D. (1997) "Memorandum from Mr David Woodward" and "Examination of Witness". House of Commons Treasury Committee: International Monetary Fund (HC68)
Woodward, D. (1998) "Memorandum from Mr David Woodward, Freelance Development Consultant" and "Examination of Witnesses". In House of Commons International Development Committee: Third Report: Debt Relief (HC563)
Woodward, D. (2005) "The IMF and World Bank in the 21st Century: the Need for Change" Written submission to the European Parliament on “Strategic Reforms of the IMF” on behalf of Jubilee Research, nef, 9 May 2005
Woodward, D. (2006) "Written Submission to the Treasury Select Committee Inquiry into 'Globalisation: The Role of the IMF’" Jubilee Research @ nef (new economics foundation), January 2006
Woodward, D. (2006) "Supplementary Evidence to the Treasury Select Committee Inquiry: ‘Globalisation: The Role of the IMF’" Jubilee Research @ nef (new economics foundation), 27 April 2006
Woodward, D. (2008) International Development Committee (UK Parliament) Inquiry: 'Sustainable Development in a Changing Climate'. Submission by David Woodward (as an independent consultant), 28 November 2008

Shorter articles published in print media
Woodward, D. (1994) "Adjustment in Africa: it's Hurting but is it Working?" Series of commissioned articles for Africa Analysis, 21 January – 18 March 1994
Woodward, D. (2005) "Sticking Plaster Solutions". Parliamentary Monitor, November 2005 (International Finance Facility)
Woodward, D. (2007) "Imagine if our Leaders were Chosen on World Bank Lines". The Guardian'', 14 June 2007

British economists
British non-fiction writers
1959 births
Alumni of Keble College, Oxford
Living people
People from Molesey
British male writers
Male non-fiction writers